Brodie "Bush" Kostecki (born 1 November 1997) is an Australian professional racing driver. He currently competes in the Repco Supercars Championship, driving the No. 99 Holden ZB Commodore for Erebus Motorsport. He is the cousin of racing drivers Kurt and Jake Kostecki.

Career results

Karting career summary

Career summary

NASCAR
(key) (Bold – Pole position awarded by qualifying time. Italics – Pole position earned by points standings or practice time. * – Most laps led.)

K&N Pro Series East

Complete Super2 Series results
(key) (Round results only), (2020 Race results only)

Supercars Championship results

Complete Bathurst 1000 results

References

External links
 
 
 V8 Supercars Official Profile

Living people
1997 births
Australian racing drivers
NASCAR drivers
Supercars Championship drivers
Racing drivers from Perth, Western Australia